ARIDA: Backland's Awakening (formerly known as Projeto Sertão) is an adventure game and survival video game developed by Aoca Game Lab. The game was released on August 2019, exclusively for Windows, through digital distribution on the Steam platform. The player experiences the journey of Cícera, a young countrywoman who needs to overcome obstacles imposed by hunger and drought in the Brazilian backlands of the 19th century.

Development 
Arida was developed by a team of eight independent developers from the Bahia studio Aoca Game Lab, a studio founded by a historian, Filipe Pereira. The game received funding from SECULT - Secretary of Culture of the State of Bahia, through Edital Culturas Digitais FCBA 2014.

The game's atmosphere is inspired by the Canudos Region of the late 19th century, a region hit by a great drought. In order to portray the environment as faithfully as possible, the team of developers traveled to the Canudos region and spent a few days observing the region.

Gameplay 
Arida is set in the Canudos Region of 1896. Throughout the game, Cícera will have to overcome the obstacles imposed by the extreme drought. For this, the player needs to gather resources, and learn survival strategies to continue the journey, such as harvesting and cooking cassava to eliminate hunger, dig wells in search of water and cooperate with other characters. The main challenge is learning to deal with the tools and inputs available, and manage the resources in the best possible way.

Awards and nominations

External links

References

Single-player video games
2019 video games
Video games developed in Brazil
Windows games
Action-adventure games
Survival video games
Indie video games
Video games with historical settings
Video games set in the 19th century
Video games set in Brazil
Android (operating system) games
iOS games